The CEV Champions League is the top official competition for men's volleyball clubs from the whole of Europe. The competition is organised every year by the European Volleyball Confederation.

Formula (2018–19 to present)

Qualification
A total of 20 teams participate in the main competition, with 18 teams being allocated direct vacancies on the basis of ranking list for European Cup Competitions, and 2 teams from the qualification rounds.

League round
20 teams take part in the League round where they are split in to 5 groups.
After each match the following points are assigned:
 Winner (3:0 or 3:1) – 3 points
 Winner (3:2) – 2 points
 Loser (2:3) – 1 point
 Loser (1:3 or 0:3) – 0 points
Each pool will be contested in a six-leg double round-robin home-and-away format.  In each gender, the five pool winners and the three best-ranked pool runners-up will advance to the quarterfinals.

Quarterfinals
4 pairs are formed and two matches are held between teams in pair.
Four winners qualify to the semifinals.

Semifinals
2 pairs are formed and two matches are held between teams in pair.
Two winners qualify to the final. Final is held in May.

History
 CEV European Champions Cup (1959–60 to 1999–2000)
 CEV Champions League (2000–01 to present)

Title holders

 1959–60:  CSKA Moscow
 1960–61:  Rapid București
 1961–62:  CSKA Moscow
 1962–63:  Rapid București
 1963–64:  SC Leipzig
 1964–65:  Rapid București
 1965–66:  Dinamo București
 1966–67:  Dinamo București
 1967–68:  Volejbal Brno
 1968–69:  CSKA Sofia
 1969–70:  Burevestnik Almaty
 1970–71:  Burevestnik Almaty
 1971–72:  Volejbal Brno
 1972–73:  CSKA Moscow
 1973–74:  CSKA Moscow
 1974–75:  CSKA Moscow
 1975–76:  Dukla Liberec
 1976–77:  CSKA Moscow
 1977–78:  Płomień Milowice
 1978–79:  Červená Hvězda Bratislava 
 1979–80:  Klippan Torino

 1980–81:  Dinamo București
 1981–82:  CSKA Moscow
 1982–83:  CSKA Moscow
 1983–84:  Santal Parma 
 1984–85:  Santal Parma 
 1985–86:  CSKA Moscow
 1986–87:  CSKA Moscow
 1987–88:  CSKA Moscow
 1988–89:  CSKA Moscow
 1989–90:  Philips Modena
 1990–91:  CSKA Moscow
 1991–92:  Messaggero Ravenna
 1992–93:  Messaggero Ravenna
 1993–94:  Messaggero Ravenna 
 1994–95:  Sisley Treviso
 1995–96:  Las Daytona Modena 
 1996–97:  Las Valtur Modena 
 1997–98:  Casa Modena Unibon
 1998–99:  Sisley Treviso 
 1999–00:  Sisley Treviso 
 2000–01:  Paris Volley

 2001–02:  Lube Banca Macerata
 2002–03:  Lokomotiv Belgorod 
 2003–04:  Lokomotiv Belgorod 
 2004–05:  Tours VB
 2005–06:  Sisley Treviso 
 2006–07:  VfB Friedrichshafen
 2007–08:  Dynamo Tattransgaz Kazan
 2008–09:  Trentino Volley
 2009–10:  BetClic Trentino 
 2010–11:  BetClic Trentino 
 2011–12:  Zenit Kazan 
 2012–13:  Lokomotiv Novosibirsk
 2013–14:  Belogorie Belgorod
 2014–15:  Zenit Kazan
 2015–16:  Zenit Kazan 
 2016–17:  Zenit Kazan
 2017–18:  Zenit Kazan
 2018–19:  Cucine Lube Civitanova
 2020–21:  ZAKSA Kędzierzyn-Koźle
 2021–22:  ZAKSA Kędzierzyn-Koźle

CEV European Champions Cup

CEV Champions League

Titles by club

Titles by country

MVP by edition
 2001–02 – 
 2002–03 – 
 2003–04 – 
 2004–05 – 
 2005–06 – 
 2006–07 – 
 2007–08 – 
 2008–09 – 
 2009–10 – 
 2010–11 – 
 2011–12 – 
 2012–13 – 
 2013–14 – 
 2014–15 – 
 2015–16 – 
 2016–17 – 
 2017–18 – 
 2018–19 – 
 2020–21 –  
 2021–22 –

References

External links

 Official Website – European Volleyball Confederation

 
League
European volleyball records and statistics
Recurring sporting events established in 1959
1959 establishments in Europe
Men's volleyball leagues
Multi-national professional sports leagues